Aleksandr Viktorovich Bubnov (born 10 October 1955, in Lyubertsy) is a Russian former professional footballer and a coach. After a short career as a coach, he has since become a radio, television and internet pundit working for the Russian website Sportbox.ru.

International career
Bubnov earned 34 caps and scored 1 goal for the USSR national football team, and played in the 1986 FIFA World Cup finals.

Honours
 Soviet Top League: 1976 (spring), 1987, 1989
 Soviet Cup: 1977
 UEFA Under-23: 1976

External links 
 RussiaTeam biography 
 Aleksandr Viktorovich Bubnov - International Appearances
 

1955 births
Living people
People from Lyubertsy
Soviet footballers
Russian footballers
Association football defenders
Soviet Union international footballers
1986 FIFA World Cup players
Soviet expatriate footballers
Expatriate footballers in France
Soviet expatriate sportspeople in France
Russian expatriate footballers
Expatriate footballers in Belarus
FC Spartak Vladikavkaz players
FC Dynamo Moscow players
FC Spartak Moscow players
Red Star F.C. players
FC Slavia Mozyr players
Soviet Top League players
Ligue 2 players
Russian football managers
FC Tyumen managers
Russian Premier League managers
Sportspeople from Moscow Oblast